is a Japanese chemist and Professor of Chemistry at University of Tokyo in Japan.

Education 

 B.S. 1986 Department of Industrial Chemistry, Faculty of Engineering Kyoto University (Prof.K. Utimoto)
 Ph. D. 1991 from Kyoto University (Directed by Prof.K. Utimoto) Thesis title "Studies on Triethylborane Induced Radical Reactions with Hydrides of Group14 Elements"
 During the PhD study, 1988-1989 exchange student at UC Berkeley (Directed by Prof. C. H.Heathcock) "Studies on the Stereo-control in the Synthesis of Acyclic Compounds"

Career

 1991–1999 Instructor of Kyoto University
 1999–2002 Associate Professor of Kyoto University
 2002–2003 Associate Professor of The University of Tokyo
 2003– Professor of The University of Tokyo (current position)

Academic Activity 

 1997– International Symposium on Homogeneous Catalysis (ISHC) International Advisory Board
 2003– Journal of Polymer Science Part A: Polymer Chemistry (Wiley) Editorial Board
 2003–2006 Dalton Transactions (RSC) International Advisory Board
 2003– Green Chemistry (RSC) Advisory Board
 2008–2013 Journal of the American Chemical Society (ACS) Editorial Advisory Board
 2009–2014 Organometallics (ACS) Editorial Advisory Board
 2009–2016 ChemCatChem (Wiley) Editorial Board
 2010– Chemical Science (RSC) Advisory Board
 2011–2013 Inorganic Chemistry (ACS) Editorial Advisory Board
 2011–2015 Catalysis Science & Technology (RSC) Advisory Board
 2014–2021 Angewandte Chemie International Edition (Wiley) International Advisory Board
 2015– Chemistry Letters (CSJ) Senior Editor
 2018– Chemical Reviews (ACS) Editorial Advisory Board
 2018– Macromolecules (ACS) Editorial Advisory Board
 2018– Chemistry – An Asian Journal (Wiley) International Advisory Board
 2019– Materials Chemistry Frontiers (RSC) Advisory Board
 2019– Polymer Chemistry (RSC) Advisory Board

Research 
 Organometallics
 Polymerization Catalyst
 Organoboron chemistry
Synthetic chemistry

 Asymmetric Synthesis Using Chiral Transitionmetal Complexes as Catalysts
 Development of New Organic Transformations Mediated by Organometallic Compounds

Awards
 2003 OMCOS Prize in organometallic chemistry
 2004 Wiley Award (the Society of Polymer Science, Japan)
 2006 Science Award (IBM Japan)
 2008 Saruhashi Prize
 2008 Mukaiyama Award (Society of Synthetic Organic Chemistry, Japan)
 2009 Catalysis Science Award (Mitsui Chemicals)
 2009 Nagoya Silver Medal
 2013 Schlenk Lecture Award
2021 L'Oréal-UNESCO For Women in Science Award
2021 Toray Science and Technology Prize
2021 IUPAC Distinguished Women in Chemistry or Chemical Engineering Award

References

Living people
Japanese chemists
Academic staff of the University of Tokyo
1964 births
Japanese women chemists